Micael Filipe Correia Borges (born 27 June 1997) is a Portuguese footballer who plays for Real as a forward.

Football career
On 29 July 2018, Borges made his professional debut with Chaves in a 2018–19 Taça da Liga match against Arouca.

References

External links

1997 births
People from Chaves, Portugal
Living people
Portuguese footballers
Association football forwards
S.C. Salgueiros players
G.D. Chaves players
AD Fafe players
Real S.C. players
Primeira Liga players
Campeonato de Portugal (league) players
Sportspeople from Vila Real District